Shotgun Justice (Czech title Teroristka) is a 2019 Czech crime comedy film starring Iva Janžurová. It was directed by Radek Bajgar.

Cast and characters
 Iva Janžurová as Marie
  as Mach
 Tatiana Vilhelmová as Helena
 Pavel Liška as Trpělka
 Eva Holubová as Eva Součková
 Jana Plodková as Kristina

Reception
Iva Janžurová was nominated for the 2019 Czech Lion Award for Best Actress in Leading Role.

References

External links
 

2019 films
Czech crime comedy films
2010s Czech-language films
2010s crime comedy films
Czech vigilante films